The Saint Sofia Church (tsarkva „Sveta Sofia“) is the oldest church in the Bulgarian capital Sofia, dating to the fourth century. In the predecessor building took place the Council of Serdica held most probably in 343 and attended by 316 bishops. In the 14th century, the church gave its name to the city, previously known as Serdika (Сердика).

History and architecture
The church was built on the site of several earlier churches from the fourth century, and places of worship dating back to the days when it was the necropolis of the Roman town of Serdica. In the second century, it was the location of a Roman theatre. Over the next few centuries, several other churches were constructed, only to be destroyed by invading forces such as the Goths and the Huns. The basic cross design of the present basilica, with its two east towers and one tower-cupola, is believed to be the fifth structure to be constructed on the site and was built during the reign of Byzantine Emperor Justinian I in the middle of the sixth century (527–565). It is thus a contemporary of the better-known Hagia Sophia church in Constantinople.

During the Second Bulgarian Empire (spanning the 12th to 14th centuries), the structure acquired the status of a metropolitan church. In the 14th century, the church gave its name to the city. In the 16th century, during Ottoman rule, the church was converted into a mosque: the original 12th-century frescoes were destroyed and minarets were added. In the 19th century, two earthquakes destroyed one of the minarets and the mosque was abandoned. Restoration work was begun after 1900.

The Saint Sofia Church is now one of the most valuable pieces of Early Christian architecture in Southeastern Europe. The present building is a cross basilica with three altars. The floor of the church is covered with complex Early Christian ornamental or flora and fauna-themed mosaics. The Saint Sofia Church stands in the middle of an ancient necropolis and many tombs have been unearthed both under and near the church. Some of the tombs even feature frescoes.

Because Saint Sophia represents Holy Wisdom, icons within the church depict Sophia as Christ Emmanuel, a young figure of Christ seated on a rainbow.  The church also displays icons of historical saints, including St. George and St. Vladimir.

Gallery

See also
 List of churches in Sofia
 History of Roman and Byzantine domes

References

External links
 The Church of St. Sofia / Църквата "Св. София"
 Historical photographs of the Saint Sophia Church
 3D Model of the Church

Sophia, Church of St
Byzantine sacred architecture
Mosques converted from churches in the Ottoman Empire
6th-century churches
Buildings of Justinian I
Byzantine architecture in Bulgaria